The Sikkim Police is the law enforcement agency of the government of Sikkim in India. It employs many people to patrol the streets. It is headquartered in the state capital Gangtok. The Sikkim Police are headed by a Director General of Police and fall under the purview of the state Home Department.

History
Sikkim, in general, has a low crime rate. In March 2007, there was a fratricidal incident involving Sikkim Police detachment protecting a bank in Delhi. A young person was accused of murdering five of his colleagues in retaliation for a sodomy attempt. However, the details are still unclear.

Government of Sikkim
State law enforcement agencies of India
Year of establishment missing
Government agencies with year of establishment missing